Walter Sydney Hammond  (2 July 1906 – 13 December 1982) was a New Zealand policeman, private detective and bailiff. He was born in Gravesend, Kent, England, on 2 July 1906.

In the 1932 New Year Honours, Hammond was awarded the King's Police Medal, in recognition of his gallantry during the rescue of crew from the steamer Progress, which was wrecked in Ōwhiro Bay, Wellington, on 1 May 1931.

References

1906 births
1982 deaths
New Zealand police officers
People from Gravesend, Kent
British emigrants to New Zealand
New Zealand recipients of the Queen's Police Medal